"Do I Love You?" is a song written by Phil Spector, Pete Andreoli and Vini Poncia. It was recorded by American girl group the Ronettes in 1964 and released on their debut album Presenting the Fabulous Ronettes.

Cash Box described it as "a pulsating, big-sounding romancer...that the gals and the Jack Nitzsche-led instrumentalists wax with money-making enthusiasm."  Matthew Greenwald of AllMusic stated that it is lyrically "about preteen romance and devotion" built around "a funky and elegant guitar/keyboard riff". The song has been covered by the bands The Symbols, Jay and the Americans, and Flamin' Groovies.

Release
The song reached number 11 on Cashbox's "Top 50 in R&B Locations" on July 18, 1964, their fourth highest charting hit on a national R&B chart. It peaked at number 34 on the U.S. Billboard Hot 100 on August 1, 1964, becoming the group's fourth consecutive top forty hit on the chart and faring slightly better than their previous single "(The Best Part of) Breakin' Up". It also reached number 35 on the UK Singles Chart and stayed on the chart for four weeks.

Charts

References

1964 songs
1964 singles
The Ronettes songs
Jay and the Americans songs
Song recordings produced by Phil Spector
Songs written by Phil Spector
Songs written by Vini Poncia
Philles Records singles